John Parnell may refer to:
 John Parnell (1680–1727), Irish MP for Granard 1713–22
 Sir John Parnell, 1st Baronet (c. 1720–1782), Irish M.P. for Maryborough
 Sir John Parnell, 2nd Baronet (1744–1801), Irish M.P. for Queen's County 1783–1801
 John Parnell, 2nd Baron Congleton (1805–1883)
 John Parnell (cricketer) (1811–1859), Irish-born English cricketer with amateur status
 John Howard Parnell (1843–1923),  Parnellite Nationalist MP for South Meath
 John Parnell Thomas (1895–1970), stockbroker and politician 
 Jack Parnell (John Russell Parnell, 1923–2010), English bandleader and musician
 John A. Parnell (born 1964), professor of management at the University of North Carolina, Pembroke